Apellániz / Apinaiz (Apinaiz in Basque) is a town located in the municipality of Arraia-Maeztu, in the province of Álava (Araba), in the autonomous community of Basque Country, northern Spain.

See also
Antoñana

External links
 APELLÁNIZ / APINAIZ in the Bernardo Estornés Lasa - Auñamendi Encyclopedia (Euskomedia Fundazioa) 

Towns in Álava